Bere Alston is a village in West Devon in the county of Devon in England.  It forms part of the civil parish of Bere Ferrers.

History and geography
With a population of about 2,000, the village lies in the Bere peninsula, between the rivers Tamar and Tavy. Its origins lie in the once thriving local mining industry, including silver and lead, and the market gardening sector. At one time, the mainline trains to London would stop at the village to pick up locally grown produce destined for the capital.

Bere Alston is about 12 km north of the centre of Plymouth as the crow flies, but the road trip requires either a long detour via Tavistock or else negotiating narrow lanes and a narrow bridge.

Trains still run to Bere Alston railway station on the picturesque Tamar Valley Line between Plymouth and Gunnislake, and trains reverse at this station. There has been discussion of making the station a junction once again by reopening the former 'main line' to Tavistock, the largest town in Devon currently without a railway station. Occasionally, the reopening of the line through to Okehampton and Exeter is suggested, since the current Plymouth to Exeter route is dependent on an extremely vulnerable route below the sea cliffs at Dawlish Warren.

Bere Alston elected two members to the unreformed House of Commons. Only a few burgage holders were entitled to vote; but as most, if not all, of these holdings were held by a single individual for most of the time that Bere Alston was a parliamentary borough, elections were seldom contested (see rotten borough). Its MPs included Sir George Beaumont, 7th Baronet, Peter King, 1st Baron King and Josceline Percy. The borough was stripped of its franchise in the Reform Act 1832.

Once home to numerous pubs, the village now only has one public house, The Edgcumbe Hotel, on Fore Street, which at one time was also a jail and later a schoolhouse. There is also a modern cafe located next door to Bere Alston United Church.

The village is surrounded by woodland and fields.

Architecture
The village is notable for having one of the oldest primary schools in Devon, Maynard's School. Erected by Sir John Maynard in 1665, the original building still forms part of the primary school today (the date is carved on a porch above the original red  doorway).

The Bere Alston United Church on Fore Street was built in 1811. The Anglican church of the Holy Trinity was built in 1848.

Sport
Bere Alston United Football Club is a member of the Devon Football Association. The 1st team play their matches in the East Cornwall Premier Division. and are managed by Kevin Taylor.

There are four pool teams playing in the Winter Tamar Valley Pool League. from Bere Alston.

From the Edgcumbe Hotel:
The Edgcumbe 'Aces' – Division 2 & The Edgcumbe 'B' – Premier Division (Division 1 Champions 2009–2010)

There is also a lawn bowling club in the village, playing in many leagues in Devon. The club is visited by many touring teams throughout the season.

See also
 Bere Alston (UK Parliament constituency)
 Bere Alston railway station

References

External links

Bere Alston Primary School
BAT's Badminton Club 
Bere Alston Woods
Bere Alston United Church
Bere Alston Bowling Club
Bere Alston United
Tamar Valley Pool League
A Short History of the Bere Alston and Calstock Light Railway

Villages in the Borough of West Devon
Bere Ferrers